Vadim Vladimirovich Kravchenko (Russian: Вадим Владимирович Кравченко; born 4 May 1969, in Almaty) is a Kazakhstani former cyclist. He competed in the 1996 and 2000 Summer Olympics in the individual pursuit.

Major results

Road

1990
 2nd Overall Tour of Turkey
1993
 1st Stage 2A Niedersachsen-Rundfahrt
1995
 2nd Overall Tour of Turkey
1998
 1st Overall Tour d'Egypte
2000
 1st Overall Tour of Romania
 2nd Overall Tour of Turkey
1st Stage 2
2001
 1st  National Time Trial Championships
 1st Stage 6 Tour of Turkey
 3rd Overall Tour d'Egypte
1st Stage 1
2002
 3rd Overall Tour d'Egypte
1st Stage 2
2003
 1st Stage 5 Tour de Serbie

Track

1987
 1st  Team pursuit, Junior World Track Championships, (with Valeri Butaro, Mikhail Orlov and Dimitri Zhdanov)
1991
 2nd Amateur team pursuit, World Track Championships
1995
 1st Individual pursuit, Asian Track Championships
1998
 Asian Games
1st Individual pursuit
2nd Team pursuit
1999
 1st Individual pursuit, Asian Track Championships
2001
 1st Individual pursuit, Asian Track Championships
2002
 Asian Games
1st Individual pursuit
3rd Team pursuit
2003
 2nd Individual pursuit, B World Track Championships

References

External links
 

1969 births
Living people
Kazakhstani male cyclists
Sportspeople from Almaty
Olympic cyclists of Kazakhstan
Cyclists at the 1996 Summer Olympics
Cyclists at the 2000 Summer Olympics
Asian Games medalists in cycling
Medalists at the 1994 Asian Games
Medalists at the 1998 Asian Games
Medalists at the 2002 Asian Games
Asian Games gold medalists for Kazakhstan
Asian Games silver medalists for Kazakhstan
Asian Games bronze medalists for Kazakhstan
Cyclists at the 1998 Asian Games
Kazakhstani people of Russian descent